() is a  river in the Karviná District, Moravian-Silesian Region, Czech Republic, in the historical region of Cieszyn Silesia.

It is a left tributary of the Olza River, which it enters in Karviná. It flows through Albrechtice and Stonava before entering Karviná. The Těrlicko Dam is located on this river.

The name is of the river means a murmuring river.

Notes

References 
 

 

Rivers of the Moravian-Silesian Region
Karviná District
Cieszyn Silesia